This is a list of retailers based or operating in South Korea.

Bookstores
 Bandi & Luni's
 Books Libro
 Kyobo Book Centre
 Youngpoong Bookstore

Cosmetics and skincare
 Amorepacific Corporation
 Banila Co.
 BOONS - 신세계 분스
 The Face Shop
 Ĭsa Knox
 Missha
 Skin Food
 It's Skin 
 ME ME Shop
 Clio 
 VPROVE
 Nature Republic
 3CE
 Etude House
 Peripera
 Laneige
 Innisfree
Mediheal
SNP
Leaders

Convenience stores
7-Eleven
CU
emart24
GS25
Ministop

Department stores
AK Plaza by AK GROUP 
Cerestar Department Store
Chonju Core Department Store
D-Cube Geoje Department Store
Daedong Department Store
Daegu Department Store, or DEBEC
Daewoo Department Store
Donga Department Store
Galleria Department Store BY HANHWA GROUP
Grand Department Store
GS Square
Haengbok Department Store  
Hyundai Department Store
I'Park Department Store by Hyundai industrial development group 
Lotte Department Store
M Department Store
NC Department Store by Eland group
Say Department Store
Shinsegae
Taepyung Department Store
Yawoori Department Store in Cheonan

Discount retailers
2001 Outlet
Costco
E-Mart
Hi-Living
Home plus
Homever
Kim's Club
Lotte Mart
Mega Mart
Newcore Outlet
Nonghyup Hanaro Mart

Electronics store
Electromart
Hi-Mart

Fashion and luxury
 Fila
 MCM
 Style Nanda
stonehenge
J estina
Metro city
MCM

On-line stores
Kmall24
Academy Media
Emart mall
G-Market
Inter Park
Jeonja Land
Raon Mall

See also
List of South Korean companies
Korean online fashion retailers
List of markets in South Korea
Economy of South Korea

Retail
South Korea